The 2000–01 NBA season was the Nuggets' 25th season in the National Basketball Association, and 34th season as a franchise. During the off-season, the Nuggets acquired Calbert Cheaney and former Nuggets guard Robert Pack from the Boston Celtics, and acquired Voshon Lenard from the Miami Heat, acquired Tracy Murray from the Washington Wizards, and re-signed free agent and former Nuggets guard Anthony Goldwire. However, Cheaney only played just nine games due to a strained left hamstring, and Tariq Abdul-Wahad only played just 29 games due to weight problems. At midseason, the Nuggets traded Murray along with Keon Clark to the Toronto Raptors in exchange for Kevin Willis.

The Nuggets got off to a 10–8 start, then lost five straight games, but then won 14 of their next 17 games, and were a playoff contender posting a record of 26–18 as of January 27. The team held a 27–24 record at the All-Star break. However, they lost 24 of their final 38 games as they missed the playoffs with a 40–42 record, sixth in the Midwest Division.

Antonio McDyess averaged 20.8 points, 12.1 rebounds and 1.5 blocks per game, and was selected for the 2001 NBA All-Star Game, while Nick Van Exel averaged 17.7 points and 8.5 assists per game, and Raef LaFrentz provided the team with 12.9 points, 7.8 rebounds, and led them with 2.6 blocks per game. In addition, Lenard contributed 12.2 points per game, while sixth man George McCloud contributed 9.6 points per game off the bench, and second-year forward James Posey provided with 8.1 points and 5.3 rebounds per game. Following the season, Willis was traded to the Milwaukee Bucks, who then sent him back to the Houston Rockets, and Pack and Goldwire were both released to free agency.

Draft picks

Roster

Regular season

Season standings

z - clinched division title
y - clinched division title
x - clinched playoff spot

Record vs. opponents

Game log

Player statistics

Regular season

Player Statistics Citation:

Awards and records

Transactions

References

See also
 2000-01 NBA season

Denver Nuggets seasons
Denver Nuggets
Denver Nuggets
Denver Nug